Constantin Georges Romain Héger (1809–1896) was a Belgian teacher of the Victorian era. He is best remembered today for his association with Emily and Charlotte Brontë during the 1840s.

Early life
Héger was born in Brussels and moved to Paris in 1825 in search of employment. For a period he worked as secretary to a solicitor, but because of a shortage of funds, was unable to pursue a legal career himself. In 1829, he returned to Brussels, where he became a teacher of French and mathematics at the Athénée Royal. In 1830, he married his first wife, Marie-Josephine Noyer. When revolution broke out in Brussels, Héger fought on the barricades from 23 to 27 September on the side of the nationalists. In September 1833, Héger's wife died during a cholera epidemic. His son, Gustave died in June 1834, at nine months old.

He was appointed a teacher in  languages, mathematics, geography and Belgian history at the veterinary college in Brussels' Rue Terarken. He continued to teach at the Athénée Royal when it relocated to the Rue des Douze Apôtres in 1839. Héger met Mlle Claire Zoë Parent (1804 – 1887), the directress of the neighbouring girls’ boarding school in the Rue Isabelle, where he began teaching. They married in 1836 and had six children.

The Brontës

In 1842 Emily and Charlotte Brontë travelled to Brussels to enroll in the boarding school run by Héger and his wife. Their aim was to improve their skills in languages. In return for board and tuition, Charlotte taught English and Emily taught music. Their time at the boarding school was cut short when Elizabeth Branwell, their aunt, who joined the family after the death of their mother to look after the children, died of internal obstruction in October 1842. Charlotte returned alone to Brussels in January 1843 to take up a teaching post at the boarding school. Her second stay there was not a happy one; she became lonely, homesick, and deeply attached to Constantin Héger. She finally returned to the Parsonage at Haworth in January 1844 and later used her time at the boarding school as the inspiration for some of The Professor and Villette.

The extent of Charlotte Brontë's feelings for Héger were not fully realised until 1913, when her letters to him were published for the first time. Héger had first shown them to Elizabeth Gaskell when she visited him in 1856 while researching her biography The Life of Charlotte Brontë, but she concealed their true significance. These letters, referred to as the 'Héger Letters', had been ripped up at some stage by Héger, but his wife had retrieved the pieces from the wastepaper bin and had meticulously sewn them back together. Paul Héger, their son, and his sisters, gave these letters to the British Museum, and they were shortly after printed in The Times newspaper.

Later years

After the Brontës’ stay at the boarding school, Héger became principal of the Athénée Royal in 1853, but resigned the position in 1855 in objection to methods implemented by the general inspectors of the school. At his request, he resumed the teaching of the youngest class in the school. He continued to give lessons in his wife's boarding school until he retired around 1882.

Constantin Héger died in 1896, and was buried with his wife and their daughter Marie, who died in 1886, in Watermael-Boitsfort municipal cemetery, on the edge of the Forêt de Soignes.

References

External links

Héger on the Brussels Bronte Group website
Héger Historiography

1809 births
1896 deaths
People from Brussels
Belgian educators